Red Iron Nights is a fantasy novel by American writer Glen Cook, the sixth novel in his ongoing Garrett P.I. series.  The series combines elements of mystery and fantasy as it follows the adventures of private investigator Garrett.

Plot introduction
Garrett is a hardboiled detective living in the city of Tun Faire, a melting pot of different races, cultures, religions, and species.  When people have problems, they often come to Garrett for help, but trouble has a way of finding Garrett on its own, whether he likes it or not.

Plot summary

Garrett is relaxing at the Joy House with Saucerhead and Morley Dotes, when Belinda Contague, a psychotic, but beautiful daughter of underworld kingpin Chodo Contague, stumbles into the bar.  She is attacked by a wizened old man who spits butterflies from his mouth and tries to drag her into his black stagecoach. Garrett stops him, though the man gets away, then moves on to his next job, tailing a religious crackpot by the name of Barking Dog Amato.  Then Captain Westman Block of the city Watch (the ineffectual, corrupt local police) comes knocking. Block needs Garrett's help to solve a series of grisly murders, in which upper class young ladies are being strung up and gutted in bizarre, ritualistic killings.

Garrett soon realizes that the attempted kidnapping of Belinda Contague is connected to the murders. Garrett and Morley track down the coach, and in a bungled sleuthing attempt, Garrett ends up killing the serial killer.  Figuring that the case is closed, Garrett finds time to spend on Barking Dog Amato, but Block later informs Garrett that there has been another murder.  It seems that an ancient curse is responsible for the murders, so that killing the murderer merely sees the ingenious, complicated spell seize control of another unfortunate and turn them into a serial killer. Worse, the curse learns from its mistakes and becomes more and more powerful with each reincarnation.

Meanwhile, Garrett finds out that Chodo Contague suffered a stroke during his encounter with the Serpent in the previous novel, Dread Brass Shadows, and Crask and Sadler are ruling the crime world in his stead.  Belinda Contague, fearing Crask and Sadler, seeks Garrett's help.  When Block and Garrett, along with Relway, an up-and-coming, fanatical, uncorrupt member of the Watch, find the new bearer of the curse, he escapes yet again.  Ultimately, after a final plot twist, the curse is broken, and Belinda Contague overthrows Crask and Sadler and takes over as ruler of the underworld, keeping her father as a figurehead.  Finally, as a gag gift, Morley gives Garrett an annoying talking parrot, which plays a role in later Garrett novels.

Characters  
Garrett
The Dead Man
Dean
Morley Dotes
Saucerhead Tharpe
Belinda Contague
Barking Dog Amato
Captain Westman Block
Playmate
Crask and Sadler
Deal Relway

Garrett P.I.
1991 American novels
American fantasy novels